Andrew Swanson (born August 4, 1987), better known by his stage name, Djemba Djemba, is an American multi-platinum record producer of Pop, EDM and bass music, from Fairfield, IA. Notable works include "Elastic Heart" and "Gangsta". He has produced for Major Lazer, Alison Wonderland, Elijah Blake, Justin Bieber, Lu Han, Britney Spears, Sia, Madonna, and Kehlani. He also makes music as Magic in the Rain.

Songwriting and other appearances

References

External links
 

1987 births
Living people
American electronic musicians
American dance musicians
People from Los Angeles
Musicians from Los Angeles
American hip hop record producers
21st-century American musicians
Record producers from California